The Ohakuri Caldera was formed in a paired single event eruption of Ohakuri ignimbrite and is  located in the Taupo Volcanic Zone on the North Island of New Zealand. Its significance was first recognised in 2004, as the geology of the area had been misunderstood until then. The paired eruption resulted in a very large eruption sequence in the Taupō Volcanic Zone about 240,000 years ago that included the formation of Lake Rotorua.

Geography
The Ohakuri Caldera lies mainly to the east and north of the Atiamuri Dam and extends almost to the Ohakuri Dam. Its borders are ill defined, particularly the northern and eastern borders, possibly because later volcanotectonic activity has completely replaced landforms that could have at one stage included a lake extending almost from Lake Rotorua to this caldera. Its western border is believed to be defined by the valley of the Mangaharakeke stream that the main highway uses and towards the north west of Atiamuri the caldera floor extends at just below the  level above sea level. Ngautuku is a dome at the south western aspect of the caldera. The much larger Maroa Caldera complex is to the south with its northern border on the Waikato River so the two caldera borders are adjacent. However the older Whakamaru Caldera almost certainly crosses the present river course and overlaps the Ohakuri Caldera to a degree. The Waikato River course follows roughly the borders of these two caldera but the thermal area of Orakei Korako to the east is likely more related to the Maroa Caldera.

Geology
There is evidence of local volcanic activity before 240,000 years ago and not all might have been due to events in the adjacent Maroa Caldera. Possibly  Pokai ignimbrite which is found to the east on the faultline of the Paeroa Fault, actually came from a caldera eruption that may have been co-located with the present Ohakuri Caldera about 275,000 years ago, but this is speculation. Ohakuri ignimbrite, which has been characterised as a deposit radiating in decreasing thickness from the Atiamuri area arises from the most significant eruption of the Caldera.  This ignimbrite deposit has been reported to extend to about 15km to the north and east. To the north east there is definite presence 17km away.

240,000 years ago Ohakuri paired eruption

There is now good evidence that 240,000 years ago Ohakuri eruption was a paired eruption within days/weeks of the very slightly earlier, slightly larger northerly eruption from the same mush body feeding the Rotorua Caldera. Between Rotorua and Ohakuri crosssections of the ash and ignimbrite from the two eruptions have been able to be sequenced completely and have relationships that can only be explained by a sequence of eruptions separated on occasions by days or less (e.g. no rainfall between eruptions). The maximum outflow dense-rock equivalent (DRE) of the Ohakuri ignimbrite is 100 cubic kilometres (24 cu mi) which means the combined eruptions produced  of material. 
This is an area known as the Horohoro Cliffs escarpment and displaced Mamaku ignimbrite from the Rotorua Caldera eruption by this amount, presumably shortly after the eruption. This fault, in the present day, while active has a much lower displacement rate of the order of /year and has been assigned by some as the outer western fault of the modern Taupō Rift although most think this is further to the east. Understanding that there is volcanotectonic interrelationship lead to a complete reinterpretation of events in the Taupō Volcanic Zone in the last 250,000 years.

Subsequent evolution
There has been interest in the mineral potential close to the western rim of the caldera.

External Links

See also

References

Taupō Volcanic Zone
Rotorua
Calderas of New Zealand
VEI-6 volcanoes
Volcanoes of Waikato
Rotorua Volcanic Centre
Pleistocene calderas